Drew Derrick Hansen (born 1972 or 1973) is an American lawyer, author, and politician serving as a member of the Washington House of Representatives from the 23rd district.

Hansen is the author of The Dream: Martin Luther King, Jr., and the Speech that Inspired a Nation.

Education 
Hansen received his bachelor's degree from Harvard University, and then studied theology at Oxford University, where he was a Rhodes Scholar. He received his Juris Doctor from Yale Law School.

Career

Law 
As an attorney, Hansen successfully represented cities in a lawsuit challenging air pollution. The Texas Clean Air Cities Coalition, a group of over 30 Texas cities, opposed the construction of a new petroleum coke-fired power plant. Hansen represented the cities, establishing that the air modeling used to support the proposed power plant was unreliable, and leading the power plant's expert to concede on cross-examination that he could "not say with certainty that any of the modeling that [he] testified about in connection with [the trial] was 100 percent accurate." After the trial, two judges recommended denial of the plant's permit, in a decision quoting from Hansen's cross-examination.

A significant part of Hansen's law practice has involved representing victims of financial fraud. He has represented the city of Baltimore, the lead plaintiff in litigation arising from the manipulation of LIBOR during the 2008-2010 financial crisis. He also represented small businesses alleging they were injured by financial arrangements in violation of the usury laws.

Politics

Hansen has led Washington state's expansion of computer science education. He sponsored legislation (HB 1472) to encourage students to take AP Computer Science, which the Seattle Times called one of the "key education reforms" in the legislative session. Microsoft general counsel Brad Smith said Hansen's bill "represents an important step forward for our kids and for the technology competitiveness of Washington state." Hansen also sponsored legislation (HB 1813) to create statewide computer-science standards and a computer-science teaching endorsement and to expand eligibility for scholarships for students interested in teaching computer science. HB 1813 was supported by nearly every major technology company in Washington.

Hansen secured new funding for new electrical engineering and cybersecurity degrees, offered in an innovative partnership between a community college and four-year universities. He was also responsible for the funding expanding the University of Washington computer science degree program.

Hansen was the principal architect of Washington's legislation to protect marine and tourism industry jobs by cleaning up derelict and abandoned boats.

Hansen sponsored the first-in-the-nation law to restore net neutrality at the state level (HB 2282) after the FCC repealed net neutrality nationwide. The bill received widespread bipartisan support and was signed into law on March 5, 2018.

Hansen reportedly considered a bid for Attorney General of Washington in 2020, but did not run.

References

1970s births
Year of birth uncertain
Living people
Democratic Party members of the Washington House of Representatives
Harvard University alumni
21st-century American politicians
American Rhodes Scholars
Alumni of the University of Oxford
Yale Law School alumni